Karaikudi is a state assembly constituency in Sivaganga district in Tamil Nadu.
Most successful party: INC (5 times). It is one of the 234 State Legislative Assembly Constituencies in Tamil Nadu in India.

History
Karaikudi is a part of the Karaikudi assembly constituency and it elects a member to the Tamil Nadu Legislative Assembly once every five years. From the 1977 elections, All India Anna Dravid Munnetra Kazhagam (AIADMK) won the assembly seat four times (in 1977, 1984, 1991 and 2009 elections), two times by Dravida Munnetra Kazhagam (DMK, 1980 and 1989), once by Tamil Maanila Congress (TMC, 1996) and three by Indian National Congress (INC) won during 2006, 2016 and 2019 elections. The current member of the legislative assembly is S. Mangudi from INC party.

Karaikudi is a part of the Sivaganga Lok Sabha constituency. The current Member of Parliament from the constituency is Karti Chidambaram from the INC.

Madras State

Tamil Nadu

Election Results

2021

2016

2011

2006

2001

1996

1991

1989

1984

1980

1977

1971

1967

1962

1957

1952

References 

Assembly constituencies of Tamil Nadu
Sivaganga district